Amphu Labtsa pass, elevation , is a glaciated pass covered in serac cliffs at the head of the Honku valley. It provides a way out of the otherwise relatively isolated Honku valley. The Amphu Labtsa pass is crossed by mountaineers en route to Island Peak or Baruntse expeditions and involves technical mountaineering. The ice and rock summit is quite exposed and provides good views of Lhotse Shar, Island Peak and the Imja Glacier. The way down into the Imja valley on the other side of the pass involves abseiling followed fixed rope descent. The approximate alpine grade of the Amphu Labtsa pass would be 'D'.

References

Mountain passes of Nepal